Aleksandra Ristovska (born 21 August 1995) is a Macedonian footballer who plays as a forward for 1. liga club ŽFK Tiverija Istatov and the North Macedonia women's national team.

References

1995 births
Living people
Women's association football forwards
Macedonian women's footballers
North Macedonia women's international footballers